Reginald Bertrand "Jack" Powell (August 17, 1891 – March 12, 1930) was a Major League Baseball pitcher who played for the St. Louis Browns in . He appeared in two games and pitched an inning in each, allowing three runs (none earned), one hit, and two walks. Powell choked to death in 1930, when he was 38, after attempting to swallow one half of a steak in a Memphis cafe.

References

External links

1891 births
1930 deaths
St. Louis Browns players
Major League Baseball pitchers
People from Dunklin County, Missouri
Baseball players from Missouri
Accidental deaths in Tennessee
Deaths from choking